The W. F. Albright Institute of Archaeological Research (AIAR) is an archaeological research institution located in East Jerusalem. It is the oldest American research center for ancient Near Eastern studies in the Middle East. Founded in 1900 as the American School of Oriental Research, it was renamed in 1970 after its most distinguished director and the father of biblical archaeology, William F. Albright. Its mission is to develop and disseminate scholarly knowledge of the literature, history, and culture of the Near East, as well as the study of civilization from pre-history to the early Islamic period.
Today, the Albright Institute is one of three separately incorporated institutes affiliated with the American Schools of Oriental Research (ASOR), the others being the American Center of Oriental Research – ACOR in Amman, Jordan, and the Cyprus American Archaeological Research Institute – CAARI – in Nicosia, Cyprus. In 1948, the then American School of Oriental Research, also known as the Jerusalem School, played a significant role in the discovery and identification of the Dead Sea Scrolls (see below). Between 1981 and 1996, the Albright Institute, together with the Institute of Archaeology, Hebrew University of Jerusalem, excavated at the ancient Philistine site of Tel Miqne-Ekron, one of the five Philistine capital cities mentioned in the Bible. With the appointment of the new director, Matthew J. Adams (2014), the institute is now engaged in the Jezreel Valley Regional Project, a long-term, multi-disciplinary survey and excavation project investigating the history of human activity in the Jezreel Valley from the Paleolithic through the Ottoman period.

Located in a 1920s-period building, now a Jerusalem landmark, the Albright maintains residential and research facilities including a 35,000 volume library, publications offices, and archaeological laboratories.

Fellowships

The institute's international fellowship program fosters a culture of intellectual integrity and respect. It provides an opportunity for students and scholars from all over the world including Israelis and Palestinians to interact and exchange information and ideas in a friendly and convivial environment, which is not duplicated in any other such institution in the region. It also promotes working relationships with related institutions in Israel and the Palestinian Authority. More than 3,000 persons participate in the Albright Institute's annual wide range of programs including lectures, reports, workshops, field trips, and social events. The institute also supports 31 ASOR-affiliated and Albright-assisted excavation, survey, and publications projects.

The Albright awards over $340,000 in grants and fellowships annually. In 2014, 64 Fellows include 34 Fellows with stipends and fee awards, and 30 Associate Senior, Post-Doctoral, and Research Fellows with funding from other sources. The Albright awards three fellowships annually through a grant from the National Endowment for the Humanities. In the academic year 2012–13, the institute initiated the Seymour Gitin Distinguished Professorship, which is open to internationally recognized senior scholars of all nationalities who have made significant contributions to their field of study.

Campus
The Albright Institute campus is located at 26 Salah ed-Din St. in East Jerusalem.

Library
The Albright Institute's library is a non-circulating library open to its fellows and researchers in Jerusalem. The collection holds more than 20,000 volumes. The library uses the ExLibria Alma automation system with Primo interface. The catalog is available online. The institute's extensive map collection has recently been made available online free of charge.

The Dead Sea Scrolls

The institute played a significant role in the discovery and preservation of the Dead Sea Scrolls. The scrolls contain approximately eight hundred separate works written between the 2nd century BCE and the 1st century CE. They include the only Jewish Bible manuscripts from that period, including a manuscript of Exodus that dates to c. 250 BCE. Manuscripts or fragments of every book in the Hebrew Bible except the Book of Esther were unearthed, as well as many other Jewish religious texts, many previously unknown. Most scholars believe that the Dead Sea Scrolls were the property of the Essenes who lived at the site of Khirbet Qumran. The Essenes were a Jewish sect active in the last century BCE and the first century CE, at the same time as the Pharisees and the Sadducees.

In the spring of 1948, the institute was contacted by a representative of Mar Samuel, the metropolitan (archbishop) of the Syrian Orthodox Church in Jerusalem, who wanted to authenticate four ancient scrolls that he had recently purchased from an antiquities dealer. One of the younger scholars in residence at the institute at that time, John C. Trever, recognized the antiquity of the manuscripts and photographed three of the four scrolls in the basement of the Albright under very adverse conditions. Trever was the first to photograph 1QIsaiah(a), a complete scroll of the book of Isaiah dating to approximately 100 BCE. Trever sent copies of his photographs to his mentor—famed Near Eastern scholar and former institute director William F. Albright, who sent him a telegram congratulating him on the "greatest manuscript discovery of modern times!”

In early September 1948, Mar Samuel contacted ASO—currently the Albright Institute—in Jerusalem and the then director Professor Ovid R. Sellers. Samuel showed Sellers some additional scroll fragments that he had acquired. Sellers then focused on finding the cave in which the scrolls had been found. In late 1948, nearly two years after the discovery of the scrolls, scholars had yet to locate the cave where the fragments had been found. Conducting such a search was dangerous. When the British mandate in Palestine ended on May 15, 1948, war broke out immediately, and peace would not be restored until November. The cave was finally discovered on January 28, 1949, by a UN observer, and Sellers brought his box brownie camera to take the first photos of the cave, which were soon published in Life magazine.

In 1952, Roland de Vaux, the head of the French Biblical School in Jerusalem, organized a search of the caves in the cliffs above the Dead Sea near the site of Qumran. ASOR joined this expedition, and discovered Cave 3, the cave in which the famous Copper Scroll was found. Cave 3 was the only Qumran cave to be completely excavated by professional archaeologists.

The Albright Institute continues to play a role in scrolls scholarship to the present day. In the 1990s, Board Chair Joy Ungerleider established a Dorot Dead Sea Scrolls fellowship at the Albright to enable young American scholars to work on the scroll fragments in the nearby Rockefeller Museum. One of the first holders of this fellowship was Sidnie White Crawford, board chair and former president of the institute, who lived and worked at the Albright from 1989 to 1991 on the editions of several Deuteronomy manuscripts from Cave 4, and the Reworked Pentateuch manuscripts, also from Cave 4. The Albright has hosted many scrolls scholars while they pursued their research, including Eugene C. Ulrich (University of Notre Dame), Mark Smith (New York University), and Eileen Schuller (McMaster University). In addition, former fellow and trustee Jodi Magness (University of North Carolina–Chapel Hill) has produced the seminal work on Qumran archaeology in the twenty-first century.

The Ekron Royal Dedicatory Inscription

The Albright's excavations at Tel Miqne Ekron is a joint project with the Hebrew University of Jerusalem, and was excavated from 1981 until 1996 under the direction of the Albright's Dorot Director and Professor of Archaeology, Seymour Gitin, and Professor Trude Dothan of the Hebrew University. The excavations have led to one of the most important archaeological discoveries in Israel in the 20th century, perhaps second only to that of the Dead Sea Scrolls. In 1996, a significant artifact for the corpus of Biblical Archaeology was recovered, a monumental dedicatory inscription of the seventh-century king of Ekron Ikausu. The inscription not only securely identifies the site by mentioned the name Ekron, but it gives a king-list of the rulers of Ekron, fathers to sons: Ya'ir, Ada, Yasid, Padi, and Ikausu, and the name of the goddess Patgayah to whom the temple is dedicated.

Both Padi and Ikausu are mentioned in the seventh century BCE Neo-Assyrian Royal Annals as kings of Ekron, thus providing a basis for dating their reigns. This makes the Ekron Inscription prime documentary evidence for establishing the chronology of events relating to the late biblical period, especially the history of the Philistines. The Goddess Patgayah refers to the Aegean mother goddess of Delphi, and Ikausu meaning the Achaean or the Greek may point to the Greek heritage of the Philistines or reflect contact between the Philistines and their ‘homeland’ Greece in the Archaic period of the 7th century, during which there was intensive economic and cultural exchange.

Albright Live YouTube Channel
The institute runs the Albright Live YouTube Channel, which features original content developed by the institute, including lectures, workshops, and other live and recorded content. This includes the series The Shmunis Family Conversations in the Archaeology and History of Ancient Israel with Israel Finkelstein. As of March 2021, 10 episodes of this series have been released with at least 22 episodes in development. The series is set up as an interview-style conversation between Albright Institute Director Matthew J. Adams and archaeologist Israel Finkelstein. Episodes cover the rise of Ancient Israel as evidenced by archaeology, ancient Near Eastern textual sources, the Bible, and archaeology from the Late Bronze Age through the Hellenistic Period.

Meals by Hisham
Meals by Hisham is a fundraising program developed by Director Matthew J. Adams and Albright Chef Hisham M'farreh in response to the closing of the institute during the COVID-19 pandemic. The program features appetizers, dinners, and deserts offered twice weekly for pickup and delivery.

Notable people

Directors

Long term directors:

 William F. Albright – 1920–29; 1933–36
 Nelson Glueck – 1936–40; 1942–47
 Paul W. Lapp – 1961–65
 William G. Dever – 1971–75
 Seymour Gitin – 1980–2014
 Matthew J. Adams – 2014–present

Among the 41 annual directors were

 David Noel Freedman
 Eric M. Meyers

ASOR/Albright past presidents

 James A. Montgomery
 Millar Burrows
 Carl H. Kraeling
 A. Henry Detweiler
 G. Ernest Wright
 Ernest S. Frerichs
 Joe Callaway
 Joe Seger
 Max Miller
 Patty Gerstenblith
 Sidnie White Crawford
 J. Edward Wright
 J.P. Dessel

Notable alumni

 Cyrus Herzl Gordon
 Baruch Halpern
 Jodi Magness
 Carol Meyers
 Anson Rainey
 Lawrence Stager
 John C. Trever
 Ziony Zevit
 Andrea Berlin

Egyptologist Flinders Petrie lived with his wife at ASOR–Jerusalem in 1933, and died there in 1942.

References

Sources
 King, Philip J. American Archaeology in the Mideast: A History of the American Schools of Oriental Research (1983).
 Clark, D.G. and V.H. Matthews 100 Years of American Archaeology in the Middle East: Proceedings of the American Schools of Oriental Research Centennial Celebration (2003).

External links

 W. F. Albright Institute of Archaeological Research
 Jerusalem Quarterly article on the Albright Institute
 Albright Live YouTube Channel

Archaeological research institutes
Research institutes established in 1900
Organizations based in Jerusalem
1900 establishments in the Ottoman Empire